The Huddleston Farmhouse Inn in Mount Auburn, Indiana, is a historic inn that once served travelers along the National Road.  It was owned by former-Quaker John Huddleston who, with his wife Susannah, and 11 children, offered lodging, cooking materials, and a place for their horses to rest for the night.

The house is three stories high, using 125,000 bricks. On the land includes the main house, spring kitchen, smoke house, and two barns. Some recents research on the property suggests that there may have been another building built on the property as well by the Huddlestons.

The main house is three stories. Before renovations the basement consisted of three separated rooms that could only be entered from outside. Two of the rooms were lodging for guests. The middle room was John's shop where he would sell items to travelers passing through. On the middle level there is a kitchen, a family room, a dining room, and a formal parlor. The third floor was where the bedrooms would have been.

The property was purchased by Indiana Landmarks in 1966 with funds provided by the organization's founder, Eli Lilly.  The house, barn, and other outbuildings have been restored and serve as combination museum and eastern regional office of Indiana Landmarks. It is open to the public for tours and special events including hearth suppers with food of the period cooked in the fireplace.

It was listed on the National Register of Historic Places in 1975.

References

External links
Huddleston page at Indiana Landmarks

National Register of Historic Places in Wayne County, Indiana
National Road
Historic house museums in Indiana
Houses completed in 1838
Houses in Wayne County, Indiana
Federal architecture in Indiana
Museums in Wayne County, Indiana
Houses on the National Register of Historic Places in Indiana